Natalya Igorevna Morozova, (born 28 January 1973 in Sverdlovsk) is a Russian volleyball player, who was a member of the national team that won the silver medals at the 1992 Summer Olympics in Barcelona and 2000 Summer Olympics in Sydney.

External links
Uralochka VC profile
sports-reference.com

1973 births
Living people
Sportspeople from Yekaterinburg
Soviet women's volleyball players
Russian women's volleyball players
Volleyball players at the 1992 Summer Olympics
Volleyball players at the 1996 Summer Olympics
Volleyball players at the 2000 Summer Olympics
Olympic volleyball players of the Unified Team
Olympic volleyball players of Russia
Olympic silver medalists for the Unified Team
Olympic silver medalists for Russia
Olympic medalists in volleyball
Medalists at the 2000 Summer Olympics
Medalists at the 1992 Summer Olympics
Competitors at the 1994 Goodwill Games
Goodwill Games medalists in volleyball